Live in Brooklyn is an extended play by American rapper Jay-Z. It was released on October 9, 2012 through record labels Roc Nation and Atlantic Records. The EP was released as digital download, and was available to pre-order on October 7, 2012 via the iTunes Store.

Background
The extended play was filmed and recorded at Barclays Center in Brooklyn, New York on October 6, 2012, where Jay-Z brought his wife Beyoncé on the stage. Both performed songs such as "Diva", "Crazy in Love" together, and closed the performance with Jay-Z's single "Young Forever". It was his eighth and last sold-out concert at Barclays Center.

Track listing

Release history

References

2012 EPs
Atlantic Records EPs
2012 live albums
Live EPs
Jay-Z EPs
Live hip hop albums